Beetaloo is the name of a pastoral lease that operates as a cattle station in the Northern Territory, known as Beetaloo Station. This area is rich in natural gas, which can be exploited by fracking, which has caused controversy.

Beetaloo Station
The property is surrounded by other pastoral leases including Hayfield, Amungee Mungee and Tanumbirini Stations to the north, Hayfield and Newcastle Waters Station to the west, Tandyidgee, Ucharonidge and Mungabroom to the south and the Mambilya-Rrumburriya Aboriginal Land Trust to the east. The Carpentaria Highway crosses the property through the north east corner and the Newcastle Creek flows through a good portion of the lease from east to west.

The Station was established in the 1890s by Harry M. Bathern who had overlanded cattle to many other properties in the Territory including Brunette Downs, Eva Downs and Emu Downs.

Compounding the immediate loss of stock and grazing pasture, drought followed the fires leading to further losses of the surviving stock. The manager, Wally Bathern, expressed concern that when the wet season arrived, bogs would form around waterholes and the weakened cattle were at risk of becoming stuck.

Beetaloo Sub-basin
The Beetaloo Sub-basin, is situated in the Sturt Plateau region, between Mataranka to the north and Elliott to the south. It covers an area of approximately 2,800,000 hectares about 500 kilometres south-east of Darwin. The Beetaloo Sub-basin is a structural component of the greater McArthur Basin. The McArthur Basin covers a range of Proterozoic sedimentary rock formations that range from the northern part of the Northern Territory from north-east WA to north-west Queensland.

The Beetaloo Sub-basin is prospective for unconventional hydrocarbons. It is estimated to contain significant amounts of recoverable shale gas, tight gas and shale oil resources. Petroleum exploration in the Beetaloo area first began in 1984 when CRA Exploration Pty Limited took up acreage in exploration permits EP4 and EP5 (since lapsed), north of the core of the Beetaloo. Exploration for shale resources was revitalized in 2015 when Origin Energy drilled two vertical exploration wells (Kalala S-l and Amungee NW-l) and one horizontal well (Amungee NV/-IH).

On 14 September 2017 the Northern Territory Government announced a  scientific inquiry into hydraulic fracturing of onshore unconventional reservoirs in the Northern Territory under the Inquiries Act (NT). This inquiry was led by Justice Rachel Pepper and supported by a panel of independent experts. Following 15 months of investigating the issue, the inquiry found the risks of fracking could be reduced to acceptable levels if 135 recommendations were implemented in full.

Economic modelling by the industry found that the development of the Beetaloo basin could "create more than 6500 full-time jobs and positive economic impacts of up to $2.8 billion for the Northern Territory and over $9 billion for Australia as a whole over 25 years." However, many members of the community, pastoralists and traditional Aboriginal caretakers of the land continue to raise concerns that rivers and water sources in the region could be polluted by the waste produced by hydraulic fracturing.

The Indigenous rangers working in the new Mimal Indigenous Protected Area are very concerned about the level of greenhouse gases which would be released by the fracking work, potentially jeopardising Australia's Paris emissions reduction target.

In June 2022, Beetaloo traditional owners shared their frustration at anti-fracking activists who they believe are ‘interfering’ on country, stating they want to "“to work together with (Northern Land Council) and this mining company to protect our country, and our sacred sites.”

Back Beetaloo Campaign 
"Back Beetaloo" refers to a campaign movement established online in early September 2021. Back Beetaloo's aim "is very simple – Tell the Federal and Territory Governments to unlock the Beetaloo Basin to benefit all Australians." The website domain for Back Beetaloo was registered by Mr Nick Palmer and his company Campaign Digital from Cherrybrook in Sydney's north-west. The website has since been accused of astroturfing. It was reported that the group was reprimanded by the AEC for not providing official authorisation on its political advertising in accordance with Commonwealth Electoral Act 1918.

See also
List of ranches and stations

References

Stations (Australian agriculture)
Pastoral leases in the Northern Territory
Sedimentary basins of Australia
Geology of the Northern Territory